Strigamia is a genus of soil centipedes in the family Linotaeniidae. Members of this family can be identified by their anteriorly tapering bodies, the extra claw on the forcipules (venom-injecting fangs), scattered coxal pores, and the distinctly swollen ultimate legs of the males. There are at least 50 described species in Strigamia. Centipedes in this genus can reach 6 cm in length and have 33 to 81 pairs of legs. This genus includes the species S. hoffmani, notable for its small size (no more than 16 mm long) and for having relatively few legs (33 or 35 pairs in males, 35 or 37 in females). 

The generic name is from Latin striga, "strip," referring to its strip of bristles.

Species
These 52 species belong to the genus Strigamia:

 Strigamia acuminata Leach (1815) c g
 Strigamia alokosternum Attems (1927) c g
 Strigamia auxa Chamberlin, 1954 g
 Strigamia bicolor Shinohara 1981 c g
 Strigamia bidens Wood, 1862 c g b
 Strigamia bothriopus Wood, 1862 c g b
 Strigamia branneri Bollman C.H. (1888) c g b
 Strigamia carmela Chamberlin, 1941 g
 Strigamia caucasia Verhoeff (1938) c g
 Strigamia cephalica Wood 1862 c g
 Strigamia chionophila Wood, 1862 c g b
 Strigamia cottiana Verhoeff (1935) c g
 Strigamia crassipes Koch (1835) c g
 Strigamia crinita Attems (1929) c g
 Strigamia engadina Verhoeff (1935) c g
 Strigamia epileptica Wood, 1862 c g b
 Strigamia exul Meinert (1886) c g
 Strigamia filicornis Wood 1862 c g
 Strigamia fulva Sager 1856 c g
 Strigamia fusata Attems, 1903 g
 Strigamia gracilis Wood 1867 c g
 Strigamia herzegowinensis Verhoeff (1935) c g
 Strigamia hirsutipes Attems (1927) c g
 Strigamia hoffmani Pereira, 2009 g
Strigamia inthanoni Bonato, Bortolin, Drago, Orlando and Dányi, 2017i g
 Strigamia japonica Verhoeff (1935) c g
 Strigamia kerrana Chamberlin (1940) c g
 Strigamia laevipes Wood 1862 c g
 Strigamia lampra Chamberlin, 1938 g
 Strigamia longicornis Meinert (1886) c g
 Strigamia lutea Matic, 1985 g
 Strigamia maculaticeps Wood 1862 c g
 Strigamia maritima Leach (1817) c g
 Strigamia monopora Takakuwa (1938) c g
 Strigamia munda Chamberlin (1952) c g
 Strigamia olympica Dobroruka 1977 c g
 Strigamia parviceps Wood 1862 c g
 Strigamia paucipora Matic, 1985 g
 Strigamia platydentata Shinohara 1981 c g
 Strigamia pseudopusillus Loksa (1962) c g
 Strigamia pusilla Seliwanoff (1884) c g
 Strigamia sacolinensis Meinert (1870) c g
 Strigamia sibirica Sseliwanoff (1881) c g
 Strigamia sulcata Seliwanoff, 1881 g
 Strigamia svenhedini Verhoeff, 1933 g
 Strigamia taeniophera Wood 1862 c g
 Strigamia tenuiungulata Takakuwa, 1938 g
 Strigamia texensis Chamberlin, 1941 g
 Strigamia transsilvanica Verhoeff (1928) c g
 Strigamia tripora Chamberlin, 1941 g
 Strigamia tropica Wood 1862 c g
 Strigamia urania Crabill, 1954 g
 Strigamia walkeri Wood 1865 c g

Data sources: i = ITIS, c = Catalogue of Life, g = GBIF, b = Bugguide.net

References

Further reading

External links

 

Geophilomorpha